The Hulman Center is a 10,200-seat multi-purpose arena on the campus of Indiana State University in Terre Haute, Indiana, United States.

History
Initially named the Hulman Civic University Center, the facility opened on December 14, 1973. Funded by donations and bond issues after an initial $2.5 million challenge gift from philanthropist Tony Hulman, the patriarch of the local Hulman family, it is home to the Indiana State Sycamores men's basketball team.

The Hulman Center has hosted many concerts in its history, including Elvis Presley, Van Halen, Frank Sinatra, Johnny Carson, Kiss, and John Denver. It has served as the site of several NCAA championship events including the 1974 Midwest Region of the NCAA men's basketball tournament, the NCAA men's gymnastics finals, and the 1979 Missouri Valley Conference men's basketball tournament title game.

From 2018 - 2020, Indiana State University underwent a renovation and enlargement of the Hulman Center.

See also
 List of NCAA Division I basketball arenas

References

External links
Official Website
Hulman Center -- Home Of Sycamore Basketball - GoSycamores.com

College basketball venues in the United States
Basketball venues in Indiana
Buildings and structures in Terre Haute, Indiana
Buildings and structures in Vigo County, Indiana
Gymnastics venues in Indiana
Indiana State Sycamores men's basketball
Tourist attractions in Terre Haute, Indiana